Treetop Cat Rescue is a television series that aired on the American television channel Animal Planet. It is a reality television program about a team who rescues housecats stuck in trees. The program originally aired on Saturday evenings. Cats are helped down from the trees by a company called Canopy Cat Rescue, who use their own equipment and expertise as arborists to try and bring down cats at no charge to the animal owners.

Episodes

References

Forestry occupations
Animal Planet original programming
2015 American television series debuts
Television series about cats